The Icelandic Basketball Player of the Year award was established in 1973 to recognize the best Icelandic basketball player of the year. The winners are basketball players who have Icelandic citizenship, and whose performances with its sports club and/or national team throughout the year has reached the highest level of excellence. All players with Icelandic citizenship, regardless of where they play in the world, qualify for the award. The winners are selected by the Icelandic Basketball Association. From 1973 to 1997 there was one award for both men and women. In 1998 the Icelandic Basketball Association decided to select both the men's and women's player of the year.

All-time award winners

1973-1997

1998–present

References

External links
Icelandic Basketball Association Official Website 

European basketball awards